Samooham is a 1993 Malayalam drama film, directed by Sathyan Anthikad, with Suhasini, Suresh Gopi, Manoj K. Jayan, Sreenivasan and Sunitha in the lead roles.

Plot
Sudhakaran runs his paddy field agriculture efficiently despite the workers being too lazy to do the work correctly. Sudhakaran leaves the field for home, knowing Rajalakshmi has come. Sudhakaran and Rajalakshmi love each other from childhood. Rajalakshmi is daughter of a Sakavu who was known as a workaholic for the party. So the party member Nedumudi always inspires Rajalakshmi to be the contestant of their party. Rajalakshmi, when asked to speak in front of the public, cries and on one day says never vote for her. This attitude people like and Rajalakshmi wins the election becoming MLA. Now one day gundas burn down poor people's hut and the people come to Rajalakshmi's house for help. Rajalakshmi visits the burnt area and goes to the police station. Here, Rajalakshmi tells them to arrest the criminals, but police refuse. For this, Rajalakshmi protests in front of the minister's car, ending up with the police handling the protesting group. Johnny, whose father died in the fire attack, has filed a case against the criminals. Now Krishnamurti, who is behind the attack because of his election defeat, kills Johnny. Next day, news spreads that Johnny's suicide is due to financial burden. But Rajalakshmi protests. To this, Udhayan, who has seen the murder, confesses to Rajalakshmi. From here on, the case become stronger, CBI investigation is asked for. But Krishnamurti's gundas rape Sunitha, who is sister of Rajalakshmi. CBI investigation gets strong when the chief gunda who murdered Johnny gets arrested and confesses. Finally at court, after a hearing, the court orders punishment for Krishnamurti, who is now arrested and taken handcuffed. Evidence is strong because of a newspaper article written by Pavithran with full evidence. Krishnamurti, while walking out of court, hits away a policeman, takes the gun and shoots at Pavithran, who gets killed. Now, a fight occurs where Krishnamurti's gundas are on one side and Sudhakaran and Majeed are on the other side, finally defeating Krishnamurti. The film ends with Sudhakaran apologising for misunderstanding Rajalakshmi as a power desiring person with no family affection and thereon is ready to give full support for Rajalakshmi's career in politics to help people. The film was a decent run at the box office.

Cast

Soundtrack

The film features songs composed by Johnson and written by Kaithapram.

External links
 
 Samooham at the Malayalam Movie Database

1990s Malayalam-language films
Films scored by Johnson
Films directed by Sathyan Anthikad